Rufus King Goodenow  (April 24, 1790 – March 24, 1863) was a United States representative from Maine. Born in Henniker, New Hampshire, he moved with his parents to Brownfield, Maine in 1802. He received limited schooling, subsequently engaged in agricultural pursuits. He also made several voyages to European ports and served as a captain in the Thirty-third Regiment, United States Infantry, in the War of 1812.  He moved to Paris, Maine in 1821. He was the brother of Robert Goodenow.

He served as clerk of the Oxford County Courts from 1821 to 1837.  Goodenow was elected a member of the Maine House of Representatives.  He was a delegate to the Whig National Convention at Harrisburg, Pennsylvania in 1839. He studied law, was admitted to the bar and practiced in the courts of Maine.  He was elected as a Whig to the Thirty-first Congress (March 4, 1849 – March 3, 1851), and died in Paris, Maine. He was interred in Riverside Cemetery.

References

1790 births
1863 deaths
People from Henniker, New Hampshire
United States Army personnel of the War of 1812
People from Brownfield, Maine
Whig Party members of the United States House of Representatives from Maine
19th-century American politicians
People from Paris, Maine
United States Army officers